For the military use of this facility prior to 2007, see Kitzingen Army Airfield

Kitzingen Airport  is a general aviation airport located in Germany, about 3 kilometres north-east of Kitzingen, Bavaria.

The airport was opened as a private, general aviation facility after the closure of the United States Army Kitzingen Army Airfield in March 2007.  It offers private aircraft and charter operations.

References
 flightstats.com, (KZG) Kitzingen Airport Information

External links

Kitzingen
Training establishments of the Luftwaffe